The 2011 Wyoming Cowboys football team represented the University of Wyoming in the 2011 NCAA Division I FBS football season. The Cowboys were led by third year head coach Dave Christensen and played their home games at War Memorial Stadium. They are members of the Mountain West Conference. They finished the season 8–5, 5–2 in Mountain West play to finish in third place. They were invited to the New Mexico Bowl where they lost to Temple.

Schedule

Game summaries

Weber State

Texas State

Bowling Green

Nebraska

Utah State

UNLV

San Diego State

TCU

Air Force

New Mexico

Boise State

Colorado State

Temple–New Mexico Bowl

References

Wyoming
Wyoming Cowboys football seasons
Wyoming Cowboys football